Morogoro is a city in the eastern part of Tanzania  west of Dar es Salaam. Morogoro is the capital of the Morogoro Region.
It is also known informally as "Mji kasoro bahari" which translates to “city short of an ocean/port." The Belgian based non-profit, APOPO trains Gambian pouched rats known as HeroRATS for landmine detection, and detection of tuberculosis in Morogoro. Morogoro lies at the base of the Uluguru Mountains and is a centre of agriculture in the region. The Sokoine University of Agriculture is based in the city. A number of missions are also located in the city, providing schools and hospitals. Morogoro is home to the Amani Centre, which has helped over 3,400 disabled people in the surrounding villages.

Water supply

Eighty percent of Morogoro's water supply comes from the Mindu Dam on the Ngerengere River. The dam project, begun in 1978, has been controversial. The lake behind the dam has led to high rates of bilharzia infection, and mercury run-off from gold mining nearby the dam has polluted the city's water supply. The dam is also being rapidly silted due to deforestation in the surrounding areas.

In 2012-13 an $8.31m USAID/MCC-funded programme was implemented for the Morogoro Water Supply Authority (MORUWASA) to rehabilitate drinking water resources from the Uluguru Mountains with an inlet and treatment plant near the Regional Governance offices at the high end of the Boma Road.

Climate

Education
Sokoine University of Agriculture, Muslim University of Morogoro, St Joseph and Jordan University College are located in Morogoro. Mzumbe University is located 26 km south of the town on the highway to Iringa. There are other famous colleges like Ardhi Institute Morogoro, Morogoro Teachers College, and LITI (Livestock Training Institute).

One of the oldest secondary schools in the country, Kilakala Girls High School (formerly known as Marian College), is also found in the municipality. Other secondary schools within the municipality are Morogoro Secondary School (formerly Aga Khan Secondary School), Forest Hill Secondary, Jabal Hira Muslim Secondary, Kigurunyembe Secondary, Lutheran Junior Seminary, St. Francis de Sales Seminary, St. Peter's Seminary and Lupanga Practising Secondary School (a newly established school near Kigurunyembe teacher's college, Kola Hill Secondary School. The English-language Morogoro International School was founded in 1975.

Transport
Public transport buses called dala dala are available for transport within the town, the fare are mostly around Tsh 400 from town to nearby area. Also for faster transportation motorcycles boda boda and Bajaj are the best within town areas; fare is depending on distance of the destination.

Sports and culture

The city is represented in the Tanzanian Premier League by football club Mtibwa Sugar F.C.

Morogoro is the home of Salim Abdullah, who was the founder of the Cuban Marimba Band, and the Morogoro Jazz Band, another well-known band established in 1944. From the mid-1960s to the 1970s, Morogoro was home to one of Tanzania's most influential and celebrated musicians, Mbaraka Mwinshehe, a lead guitarist and singer-songwriter.

Sister cities

The city of Milwaukee in the state of Wisconsin in the United States is a sister city of Morogoro as designated by Sister Cities International. Morogoro is also twinned with Linköping in Sweden and Vaasa in Finland.

Fuel tanker explosion 
On 10 August 2019, a fuel tanker exploded in the town, killing 100 people and injuring at least 47 others. The event was one of the largest disasters of its kind to happen in Tanzania.

Gallery

References

External links

 
Regional capitals in Tanzania
Populated places in Morogoro Region